May 33rd is a 2004 British television film, produced by Endor Productions for BBC One. The film was directed by David Attwood, written by Guy Hibbert, and produced by Hilary Bevan Jones. It stars Lia Williams as Ella Wilson, a woman whose osteopath discovers she is suffering from dissociative identity disorder after years of ritual abuse.

Cast
 Lia Williams – Ella Wilson
 Søren Byder – Edward Sorgesen

References

External links

2004 television films
2004 films
BBC television dramas
British television films
Dissociative identity disorder in television
Films directed by David Attwood (film director)